The Sin (translit. Al Haram ) is a classical 1965 Egyptian drama film directed by Henry Barakat. The film stars Faten Hamama, Zaki Rostom, and Abdullah Gaith and is based on a novel by the same title by Yūsuf Idrīs. The film was nominated for the Prix International award at the 1965 Cannes Film Festival. It was also chosen as one of the best 100 Egyptian film productions in the Egyptian cinema centennial. A survey by Al-Fonoon magazine in 1984 chose it as one of the best ten films in Top 100 films the history of Egyptian cinema.

Plot 

Azizah, a poor peasant, portrays worker oppression in this somber social drama. She gets savagely raped by a guard when she goes into the fields to gather potatoes. She does not reveal what had happened to her husband who is suffering from an illness. She conceals the pregnancy and throttles the baby after it is born. She also dies soon thereafter. The migrant workers rally around her memory as she becomes a martyr to the cause of the struggling peasants.

The newspaper Le Monde wrote: "we have been attracted to this film due to the true picture that reflects the suffering of this village, the picture is not about a problem for one individual, it’s about the reflection of everything surrounding her, from people to culture."

Cast 
 Faten Hamama as Azizah.
 Zaki Rostom as the guard.
 Abdullah Gaith as Aziza's husband.

References

External links 
 

1965 films
1960s Arabic-language films
1965 drama films
Films based on Egyptian novels
Films directed by Henry Barakat
S
Egyptian drama films